The Viện cơ mật or "Secret Institute" (chữ Nôm: 院機密; chữ Hán: 機密院), established in 1834, was the Privy Council and key mandarin agency of the royal court of Vietnam's final Nguyễn dynasty at Huế, until the end of the dynasty in 1945.

History 

The Minh Mạng Emperor established the Viện cơ mật (Privy Council) along with the Nội các Viên (Cabinet, Grand Secretariat) as the main agencies of the court's administration. The Privy Council, or Secret Institute, comprised four of the most senior mandarins. Minh Mạng based the relationship of the Nội các and the Cơ mật viện on the relationship of the Nội các and the Quân cơ xứ (軍機處) within the bureaucratic framework of the Manchu-led Qing dynasty in China.

In the year 1834, Minh Mạng's political project (dự án chính trị) was expanded to Cambodia, the Siamese army attacked from the Vietnam-Laos border down to Hà Tiên province. At the same time there were widespread rebellions from Cao Bằng province to Gia Định province. These situations forced the Minh Mạng Emperor to work with a smaller and more flexible close-knit group as he needed to discuss classified communications, military emergencies, and rapid response to the war situation. This was the reason why the Cơ mật viện was established.

In 1897 the Resident-Superior of Annam was granted the power to appoint the Nguyễn dynasty Emperors and presided over the meetings of the Viện cơ mật. These moves incorporated French officials directly into the administrative structure of the Imperial Huế Court and further legitimised French rule in the legislative branch of the Nguyễn government.

References 

Government of the Nguyễn dynasty
1834 establishments in Vietnam
Privy councils